Christopher Caldwell (born 1962) is a right-wing American journalist, and a former senior editor at neoconservative magazine The Weekly Standard, as well as a regular contributor to the Financial Times and Slate. He is a senior fellow at the Claremont Institute, conservative think tank, and contributing editor to the Claremont Review of Books. His writing also frequently appears in The Wall Street Journal, The New York Times (where he is a contributing editor to the paper's magazine), and The Washington Post. He was also a regular contributor to The Atlantic Monthly and the New York Press and the assistant managing editor of The American Spectator.

Early life and education
Caldwell was born in Lynn, Massachusetts, and is a graduate of Harvard College, where he studied English literature.

Career
Caldwell's 2009 book Reflections on the Revolution in Europe, which deals with increased Muslim immigration to Europe, received mixed reactions. The Economist newspaper called it "an important book as well as a provocative one: the best statement to date of the pessimist's position on Islamic immigration in Europe." The Marxist historian Perry Anderson, though critical of his arguments, nonetheless called it "the most striking single book to have appeared, in any language, on immigration in Western Europe". Others were more blunt, accusing Caldwell of stoking what The Guardian referred to as a "culture of fear". Caldwell insists that he is "instinctively pro-immigration" and conscious of the media tendency to "sensationalize stories against Muslims".

In 2020 he published The Age of Entitlement: America Since the Sixties, in which he argues that the civil rights movement has had significant unintended consequences: "Just half a decade into the civil rights revolution, America had something it had never had at the federal level, something the overwhelming majority of its citizens would never have approved: an explicit system of racial preference. Plainly the civil rights acts had wrought a change in the country's constitutional culture." Caldwell writes that the Civil Rights Act 1964 was "not just a major new element in the Constitution," but "a rival constitution, with which the original one was frequently incompatible."

It was reviewed in The New York Times, The Wall Street Journal and the Claremont Review of Books. Richard Aldous wrote in The Wall Street Journal'', "It's curious that a book subtitled 'America Since the Sixties' doesn't actually have much history in it," going on to say "The reader turns the page expectantly, waiting to see what Mr. Caldwell has to say about President Trump. We will never know, at least not from reading this book, because Mr. Caldwell ends in 2015. [...] That's a shame, because “The Age of Entitlement” raises important questions not just about the future of the republic but about Western society more generally." The newspaper went on to list it as one of their Best Political Books of 2020, however.

Personal life
His wife, Zelda, is the daughter of journalist Robert Novak. Caldwell has five children. His daughter Lucy Caldwell was the campaign manager for Joe Walsh's presidential campaign challenging Donald Trump for the Republican nomination in 2020.

References

External links

 Financial Times bio
 The Financial Times Author archive.
 

1962 births
American political writers
American male non-fiction writers
Harvard College alumni
Living people
Anti-immigration politics in the United States
People from Lynn, Massachusetts
The American Spectator people
The Weekly Standard people
Journalists from Massachusetts
20th-century American journalists
American male journalists
21st-century American journalists